Charaxes kheili is a butterfly in the family Nymphalidae. It is found in Cameroon, Gabon, the Central African Republic and the north-western part of the Democratic Republic of the Congo. The habitat consists of woodland savanna.

Description
Ch. kheili Stgr. male: wings above with black ground-colour; forewing with large blue marginal 
spots, a row of 8 or 9 blue, or in cellules 6 and 7 white postdiscal spots at 5 mm. from the distal margin, 2—4 discal spots in 3—6, and usually also a blue spot in the cell. Hindwing behind the middle in cellules 2—5 with a somewhat irregular band of 4—5 spots; submarginal and marginal spots small and blue. Under surface as in ethalion.Female unknown. Congo and Niam-niam-land.

Taxonomy
Charaxes kheili is a member of the large species group Charaxes etheocles.

Realm
Afrotropical realm

References

Victor Gurney Logan Van Someren, 1969 Revisional notes on African Charaxes (Lepidoptera: Nymphalidae). Part V. Bulletin of the British Museum (Natural History) (Entomology)75-166.

External links
Charaxes kheili images at Consortium for the Barcode of Life
Charaxes kheili f. curvilinea images at BOLD
Charaxes kheili f. flavimacula images at BOLD
Images of C. kheili Royal Museum for Central Africa (Albertine Rift Project)

Butterflies described in 1896
kheili
Butterflies of Africa
Taxa named by Otto Staudinger